EMILY's List is an American political action committee (PAC) that aims to help elect Democratic female candidates in favor of abortion rights to office. It was founded by Ellen Malcolm in 1985. The group's name is an acronym for "Early Money Is Like Yeast". Malcolm commented that "it makes the dough rise". The saying is a reference to a convention of political fundraising: that receiving many donations early in a race helps to attract subsequent donors. EMILY's List bundles contributions to the campaigns of Democratic women in favor of abortion rights running in targeted races.

From 1985 through 2008, EMILY's List had raised and spent $240 million for political candidates. EMILY's List spent $27.4 million in 2010, $34 million in 2012, and $44.9 million in 2014. The organization was on track to raise $60 million for the 2016 election cycle, much of it earmarked for Hillary Clinton, whose presidential bid EMILY's List had endorsed.

History and mission

EMILY's List was founded in 1985, when 25 women met in the home of Ellen Malcolm. Founding members included Barbara Boxer, Ann Richards, Anne Wexler, and Donna Shalala. In 1986, early financial support from EMILY's List helped elect Barbara Mikulski of Maryland, the first female Democrat elected to the U.S. Senate in her own right (not appointed or filling a seat of a deceased husband).

The group's mission is to cultivate a donor network to raise money for female Democratic candidates in favor of abortion rights. To become an official EMILY's List member, an individual must pay $100 to join EMILY's List, and agree to donate a minimum of $100 each to two U.S. Senate, U.S. House, or gubernatorial candidates. Members make their donations directly to EMILY's List, which bundles the checks together and forwards them to candidates.

In her book, When Women Win: EMILY's List and the Rise of Women in American Politics, Ellen Malcolm, the founder of the organization, stated that "creating progressive policies and promoting them can be incredibly valuable. But those policies will never be implemented unless enough politicians are elected who support them." They focused specifically on women in favor of abortion rights because they felt that "women couldn't be equal until they had control over their bodies."

They chose to focus on raising early money for women because women were not getting money from the Democratic party and thus were generally not winning races even if they were qualified, and they felt that early money could help convince people that their campaigns were credible and would help them raise more money later on.

For the 2006 election cycle, EMILY's List raised about $46 million for candidates and the group was listed as the biggest PAC in the nation by Political Money Line. EMILY's List endorsed 31 candidates in 2006, eight of whom were victorious.

In 2008, EMILY's List endorsed 22 U.S. House candidates, two U.S. Senate candidates, and three gubernatorial contenders. The PAC helped elect two new female senators, Kay Hagan of North Carolina and Jeanne Shaheen of New Hampshire, and supported the gubernatorial election of Bev Perdue of North Carolina, the re-election of Gov. Christine Gregoire of Washington, and the successful elections of twelve new women to the United States House of Representatives.

EMILY's List criteria for picking candidates include staff recommendations, viability, "demographics and history of the district, analysis of opponents or potential opponents, analysis of candidate's education, political experience, etc., demonstrated success at fund-raising, poll data to demonstrate name recognition and grass roots support."

Staff
Laphonza Butler took over as President of EMILY's List in 2021. She was preceded by Stephanie Schriock (2010-2021). Emily Cain has served as Executive Director since 2017. Amy Dacey was the executive director of EMILY's List from 2010 through 2013.

The organization's board of directors includes Ellen Malcolm, Rebecca Haile, Yolanda Caraway, Yvette Nicole Brown, Maya Harris, María Teresa Kumar, Wendy Greuel, Judith Lichtman, and Donald Sussman.

Programs
The Political Opportunity Program (POP) was established in 2001 to encourage Democratic women in favor of abortion rights to run for state and local office. POP targets its resources toward Democratic women in favor of abortion rights running for state legislatures, state constitutional offices, and local offices.

Women Vote! 
In 1995, EMILY's List began a program called Women Vote! in order to promote a higher voter turnout among women. Women Vote! is Emily's List's independent expenditure arm which communicates directly with voters.

Madam President 
In 2013, EMILY's List announced its Madam President campaign, saying "There is a mandate for women's leadership in this country. But we have yet to break through the final glass ceiling and put a woman at the top of the Democratic ticket and into the Presidency." Madam President now houses the former social media presences of Ready for Hillary PAC which did grassroots organizing in preparation for Hillary Clinton's presidential candidacy.

Criticism
Critics would like to see EMILY's List expand its definition of "women's issues" to include economic issues like a higher minimum wage and expanded Social Security. Others have said that the group simply needs to focus its resources better, staying out of races where there is already an incumbent progressive Democrat and focus on other races instead. Democrat Marcy Kaptur criticized EMILY's List for being too narrow in focus by emphasizing abortion rights over other progressive issues, such as the minimum wage, that also affect women.

EMILY'S List in the past has received some criticism from how much money they are accepting and where that money is going to as being a Political Action Committee or PAC. In Nick Hoffman's article EMILY's List v. FEC he discusses EMILY's List as a non-profit that has had trouble with the Federal Election Commission or FEC.  Hoffman accuses EMILY's List of arguing with the FEC over how much money should be allowed to be given to campaigns. EMILY's List has been criticized for pushing the allowance of no limit on how much money can be donated to campaigns.

EMILY's List has had criticism over exactly how much influence they have had in past elections. Rebecca J. Hannagan et al., article "Does an EMILY's List Endorsement Predict Electoral Success or Does EMILY Pick the Winners?" conducted research as to how much influence does EMILY's List have in a campaign. The research was set up to show exactly whether or not an endorsement got a candidate elected, did not get a candidate elected, or nothing happened. The research showed that the endorsement helped those who were mostly likely not to be endorsed, hurt candidates that people did not know whether or not they were going to be endorsed by EMILY's List, and did nothing for those who were expected to be endorsed in the first place. The article also analyzed the women's Political Action Committee that EMILY's List or "EList"  has been an ally to the democratic party helping more and more democratic party candidates becoming the "grand dame" of Women's PACs.

Endorsements

Endorsed candidates 
EMILY's List provides trainings, recruits women to run, and endorses and funds female political candidates. EMILY's List is listed as an “important source of candidate support,” in a 2010 article in the Harvard International Review.

Presidential

During the 2008 Democratic presidential primaries, EMILY's List supported Hillary Clinton over Barack Obama and bundled $855,518 for Clinton, making the group one of the five largest donors to her 2008 campaign. When NARAL endorsed Barack Obama over Hillary Clinton, EMILY's List was strongly critical. EMILY's List President Ellen Malcolm said, “I think it is tremendously disrespectful to Sen. Clinton - who held up the nomination of a FDA commissioner in order to force approval of Plan B and who spoke so eloquently during the Supreme Court nomination about the importance of protecting Roe vs. Wade - to not give her the courtesy to finish the final three weeks of the primary process. It certainly must be disconcerting for elected leaders who stand up for reproductive rights and expect the choice community will stand with them.”

After the conclusion of the Democratic presidential primary, EMILY's List moved their support to Barack Obama and was vocal in their opposition to the McCain/Palin ticket.

On April 12, 2015, EMILY's List endorsed Hillary Clinton for president. The endorsement came within hours of Clinton's announcement that she had formed an exploratory committee to run for president.

In the 2020 Democratic presidential primaries EMILY's List endorsed Senator Elizabeth Warren the day before Super Tuesday.

2012
In 2012, 80% of the candidates endorsed by EMILY's List in the general election won a seat.

2014
In the 2014 election cycle, EMILY's List endorsed 24 U.S. House candidates, six U.S. Senate candidates, and six gubernatorial candidates. Of these 40 candidates endorsed by EMILY's List, 42.5% won.

2018 
In the 2018 election, EMILY's List endorsed eight women in gubernatorial races, 12 for U.S. Senate, and 64 candidates for the House of Representatives.

Similar groups
Similar groups have formed along the same lines as EMILY's List, with some slight variations. The Wish List supports Republican women in favor of abortion rights. In 1994, Joan Kirner created a similar organization in Australia by the name EMILY's List Australia.

Political activist and former school teacher Amy Laufer founded Virginia's List, a political group supporting Democratic women running for office in Virginia.

On the other side of the abortion debate, the Susan B. Anthony List, an anti-abortion PAC, supports women who oppose abortion and is seen as the anti-abortion counterpart to EMILY's List.

Maggie's List is a United States federal political action committee founded in Florida in 2010 to "raise awareness and funds to increase the number of conservative women elected to federal public office."

References

Further reading
 Cooperman, Rosalyn, and Melody Crowder-Meyer. "Standing on Their Shoulders: Suffragists, Women’s PACs, and Demands for Women’s Representation." PS: Political Science & Politics 53.3 (2020): 470-473.
 Crowder-Meyer, Melody, and Rosalyn Cooperman. "Can’t buy them love: How party culture among donors contributes to the party gap in women’s representation." Journal of Politics 80.4 (2018): 1211-1224.
 Manuel, Daniel. "EMILY’s List (Early Money Is Like Yeast)." in Women in the American Political System: An Encyclopedia of Women as Voters, Candidates, and Office Holders (2018): 127+.
 Ondercin, Heather L. "Who is responsible for the gender gap? The dynamics of men’s and women’s democratic macropartisanship, 1950–2012." Political Research Quarterly 70.4 (2017): 749-761.
 Pimlott, Jamie.  Women and the Democratic Party: The Evolution of Emily's List (Cambria Press; 2010) 209 pages; the history from 1985 through the 2008.

External links
EMILY's List website
PAC recipients list

United States political action committees
Women's political advocacy groups in the United States
Feminist organizations in the United States
Organizations established in 1985
527 organizations
Abortion-rights organizations in the United States
Progressive organizations in the United States
1985 establishments in the United States